China National Highway 318 (G318) runs from Shanghai to Zhangmu on the China-Nepal border. From Lhasa to Zhangmu it is also called Friendship Highway.
At the Sino-Nepal Friendship Bridge, it connects with the 115 km long Araniko Highway
to Kathmandu.

Route and distance

See also

 China National Highways
 AH1

External links
Official website of Ministry of Transport of PRC

318
Road transport in Shanghai
Transport in Zhejiang
Transport in Anhui
Transport in Hubei
Transport in Chongqing
Transport in Sichuan
Roads in Tibet